Gugarchin (also Romanized as Gūgarchīn; also known as Gūgerjīn and Moḩammed Qazveynī Gūgarchīn) is a village in Dursun Khvajeh Rural District, in the Central District of Nir County, Ardabil Province, Iran. At the 2006 census, its population was 178, with 41 families.

References 

Tageo

Towns and villages in Nir County